Kenneth Wallace Nicolson (23 April 1902 – 25 July 1975) was an  Australian rules footballer who played with Geelong in the Victorian Football League (VFL).

Notes

External links 

1902 births
1975 deaths
Australian rules footballers from Victoria (Australia)
Geelong Football Club players